Igor and Olga Machlak are a Russian piano duo based in Ormond, Melbourne, Australia. Both graduated from the Moscow Tchaikovsky Conservatory as solo pianists with first class honours. They have won multiple awards. "Unknowned in the European countries", this "remarkable  pair" have been playing together for over 20 years. They moved to Australia in 1995, and have had two children, Iounna and Misha, both of whom are also musicians.

References

External links 
 Igor and Olga Piano Duo
 Igor Machlak and Olga Kharitonova Piano Duo
 IgorMachlak&OlgaKharitonovaPianoDuo
 A Family Affair
 Dualities: Igor Machlak, Olga Kharitonova

Russian pianists
Living people
21st-century pianists
Year of birth missing (living people)
Australian pianists
Musical duos
Russian emigrants to Australia
Musicians from Melbourne
People from Ormond, Victoria
Moscow Conservatory alumni